George Smith Blake (March 5, 1802 – June 24, 1871) was a commodore in the United States Navy. He was Superintendent of the United States Naval Academy in Annapolis, Maryland from September 15, 1857 to September 9, 1865. The USC&GS George S. Blake was named in his honor.

He was elected a member of the American Antiquarian Society in 1859.

References

Superintendents of the United States Naval Academy
1802 births
1871 deaths
People from Worcester, Massachusetts
Members of the American Antiquarian Society
United States Navy commodores
Military personnel from Massachusetts